Avoidance is a British comedy drama television series made for BBC One starring Romesh Ranganathan, Lisa McGrillis and Jessica Knappett. The show consisted of six episodes and was broadcast in consecutive weeks from 10 June 2022.

Plot
Thrown out by his wife Claire, Jonathan is so desperate to avoid difficult conversations, that rather than telling his son that his mum and dad are splitting up, he takes the young Spencer to hide out with his sister Danielle and her wife Courtney.

Cast
Romesh Ranganathan as Jonathan
Lisa McGrillis as Courtney
Jessica Knappett as Claire
Mandeep Dhillon as Danielle
Kieran Logendra as Spencer

Production
The project was announced by the BBC in January 2022 with Ranganathan show creator via his own production company Ranga Bee with CPL Productions with Ben Green co-writer and director and McGrillis and Knappett as co-stars.  Some filming took place in Bracknell, and Berkhamsted.

Broadcast
Episode one aired on BBC One and BBC iPlayer at 9:30pm on Friday 10 June, 2022.

Reception
Lucy Mangan in The Guardian described a “gentle, truthful, beautifully performed comedy about the ultimate beta male”. The show was negatively reviewed in The Daily Telegraph which labelled it “sad-com bore” with Marianka Swain saying “I think we’re supposed to sympathise with Jonathan, who may have some underlying mental health issues…But in the two episodes that I’ve seen, he’s essentially a black hole of denial and failure sucking in everyone around him.

References

External links

2022 British television series debuts
2022 British television series endings
English-language television shows
2020s British comedy television series